18 Greatest Hits is a greatest hits album by American singer Michael Jackson and the Jackson 5. It spent three weeks at the top of the charts in the United Kingdom upon its release in June 1983 by Motown and Telstar Records. It became Jackson's second number one on the UK Albums Chart, right behind Thriller (1982), as well as the Jackson 5's first and only number-one album.

Track listing
Tracks 2, 4, 6, 8, 12, 13, 14, 16, 17 and 18 sung by The Jackson 5.
"One Day in Your Life" (from Forever, Michael)
"Lookin' Through the Windows" (from Lookin' Through the Windows)
"Got to Be There" (from Got to Be There)
"Doctor My Eyes" (from Lookin' Through the Windows)
"Ben" (from Ben)
"ABC" (from ABC)
"We're Almost There" (from Forever, Michael)
"Skywriter" (from Skywriter)
"Rockin' Robin" (from Got to Be There)
"Happy" (from Music & Me)
"Ain't No Sunshine" (from Got to Be There)
"I'll Be There" (from Third Album)
"I Want You Back" (from Diana Ross Presents The Jackson 5)
"The Love You Save" (from ABC)
"We've Got a Good Thing Going" (from Ben)
"Mama's Pearl" (from Third Album)
"Never Can Say Goodbye" (from Maybe Tomorrow)
"Hallelujah Day" (from Skywriter)

Charts and certifications

Charts

Certifications

See also
 List of UK Albums Chart number ones of the 1980s

References

1983 compilation albums
Michael Jackson compilation albums
Motown compilation albums